The 1996–97 Sporting de Gijón season was the 35th season of the club in La Liga, the 21st consecutive after its last promotion.

Overview
Threatened by the relegation, Benito Floro was sacked after four consecutive losses. Miguel Montes replaced him since the round 35 and finally avoided the last positions and saved the place in La Liga with a 3–0 win over Rayo Vallecano in the 41st round of 42.

Squad

From the youth squad

Competitions

La Liga

Results by round

League table

Matches

Copa del Rey

Matches

Squad statistics

Appearances and goals

|}

References

External links
Profile at BDFutbol
Official website

1996-97
Sporting de Gijon